Thalictrum is a genus of 120-200 species of herbaceous perennial flowering plants in the buttercup family, Ranunculaceae, native mostly to temperate regions. Meadow-rue is a common name for plants in this genus.

Thalictrum is a taxonomically difficult genus with poorly understood species boundaries; it is in need of further taxonomic and field research for clarification.

Despite their common name of "meadow-rue", Thalictrum species are not closely related to the true rue (family Rutaceae), but resemble its members in having compound leaves twice or thrice divided.

Description 
Meadow-rue leaves are alternate, bipinnately compound, and commonly glaucous blue-green in colour.

The flowers are small and apetalous (no petals), but have numerous long stamens, often brightly white, yellow, pink or pale purple, and are produced in conspicuous dense inflorescences. In some species (e.g. T. chelidonii, T. tuberosum), the sepals are large, brightly coloured and petal-like, but in most they are small and fall when the flower opens or soon after.

Habitat and distribution
Meadow-rues are usually found in shaded or damp locations, with a sub-cosmopolitan range throughout most of the Northern Hemisphere and also south to southern Africa and tropical South America, but absent from Australasia. They are most common in temperate regions of the world; twenty-two species are found in North America.

Ecology
Anemophily (wind pollination) is a characteristic of some members this genus, as seen in Thalictrum fendleri and Thalictrum dioicum. Others, such as Thalictrum sparsiflorum, are entomophilous (pollinated by insects).

Thalictrum species are used as food plants by the larvae of some Lepidoptera species including the Setaceous Hebrew Character moth.

Chemical constituents
Thalictrum species have been extensively studied by chemists. Typical natural products found in this genus are benzylisoquinoline alkaloids such as magnoflorine, hernandezine, and the structurally related alkaloid berberine.

Selected species 

 Thalictrum alpinum – alpine meadow-rue
 Thalictrum aquilegiifolium – greater meadow-rue
 Thalictrum chelidonii
 Thalictrum cooleyi – Cooley's meadow-rue
 Thalictrum coreanum
 Thalictrum clavatum - mountain meadow-rue
 Thalictrum dasycarpum
 Thalictrum delavayi – Chinese meadow-rue
 Thalictrum dioicum – early meadow-rue
 Thalictrum fendleri – Fendler's meadow-rue
 Thalictrum filamentosum
 Thalictrum flavum – yellow or common meadow-rue
 Thalictrum glaucum
 Thalictrum heliophilum – cathedral meadow-rue
 Thalictrum kiusianum – Kyushu meadow-rue, dwarf meadow-rue
 Thalictrum minus – lesser meadow-rue
 Thalictrum occidentale – western meadow-rue
 Thalictrum pubescens
 Thalictrum revolutum - waxyleaf meadow-rue
 Thalictrum rochebruneanum – lavender mist meadow-rue
 Thalictrum sparsiflorum – fewflower meadow-rue
 Thalictrum thalictroides – rue-anemone (syn. Anemonella thalictroides)
 Thalictrum tuberosum
 Thalictrum urbainii

Cultivation
Thalictrum species are valued as ornamental garden plants, with their sprays of flowers in delicate shades. The following cultivars, with mixed or unknown parents, have received the Royal Horticultural Society's Award of Garden Merit:
'Black Stockings'
'Elin'
 = 'Fr21034'
'Tukker Princess'

Gallery

References

External links 

 
Ranunculaceae genera
Taxa named by Joseph Pitton de Tournefort